Sung-woo, also spelled Seong-woo or Seong-wu, is a Korean masculine given name. The meaning differs based on the hanja used to write each syllable of the name. There are 27 hanja with the reading "sung" and 41 hanja with the reading "woo" on the South Korean government's official list of hanja which may be registered for use in given names.

People with this name include:
Lee Seong-u, South Korean politician; see List of members of the South Korean Constituent Assembly, 1948–50
Park Seong-u, South Korean politician; see List of members of the National Assembly (South Korea), 1950–54
Choi Seong-woo (born 1954), South Korean voice actress
Shin Sung-woo (born 1967), South Korean rock singer and actor
Park Sung-woo (badminton) (born 1971), South Korean badminton player
Bae Seong-woo (born 1972), South Korean actor
Park Sung-woo (artist) (born 1972), South Korean manhwa artist
Youn Sung-woo (born 1989), South Korean footballer
Jeon Sung-woo (born 1987), South Korean actor
Ong Seong-wu (born 1995), South Korean singer and actor, former member of Wanna One

See also
List of Korean given names

References

Korean masculine given names